Vazhichal  is a village in Thiruvananthapuram district in the state of Kerala, India.

Demographics
 India census, Vazhichal had a population of 10606 with 5189 males and 5417 females.

References

Villages in Thiruvananthapuram district